John de Cresswell was an English soldier and nobleman.

Biography 
John was a younger son of Alexander de Cresswell. He was engaged in the Hundred Years' War and was Captain of Bordeaux Castle. 

After the crushing English defeat at  Pontvallain, Cresswell was in charge of an English garrison at Saint-Maur. A French army, led by Bertrand du Guesclin approached and after on assault was defeated negotiations arranged the English release on payment for the town.

During an expedition in Scotland he was taken prisoner, along with Lord Greystoke in 1380. Richard II of England organised his release. He is known to have had two sons, John and George.

Citations

References

 

Year of birth unknown
Year of death unknown
14th-century English people
English soldiers
14th-century military history of the Kingdom of England
Place of birth missing